Christiaan Roets (born 5 September 1980) is a former semi-professional rugby league footballer who represented the Welsh national team, most notably at the 2011 Four Nations, 2013 World Cup, and 2017 World Cup.

Background
Roets was born in South Africa.

Playing career
Roets played for the Swansea Valley Miners and the Bridgend Blue Bulls in the Wales amateur competition. In 2009, he played two matches for the Crusaders RL in the Super League reserve grade.

After two seasons with the South Wales Scorpions, Roets joined the North Wales Crusaders in 2012. He returned to the Scorpions early in the 2016 season.

Representative career
Roets made his international début for Wales against  at the 2009 European Cup, scoring three tries in a man of the match performance. He also featured in the European Cup Championship Final against  scoring one try.
Roets scored a try for Wales in their game against England in the 2012 Tri-Nations.

Roets played for Wales in the 2013 Rugby League World Cup. Roets was the top scorer for the Welsh, scoring four tries in the tournament.

In October 2014, Roets played in the 2014 European Cup. He scored a try in the opening game against Scotland.

In October 2015, Roets played in the 2015 European Cup tournament.

In October 2016, Roets played in the 2017 World Cup qualifiers.

Roets also represented Wales Students (scoring five tries in twelve matches) and Wales Amateurs (scoring four tries in nine matches) during his career.

Post-playing career
On 3 March 2022, Roets was announced as team manager of the Wales men's national team ahead of the 2021 World Cup.

References

External links
(archived by web.archive.org) Statistics at rlwc2017.com

1980 births
Living people
Bridgend Blue Bulls players
South Wales Scorpions players
North Wales Crusaders players
Rugby league centres
Rugby league second-rows
South African emigrants to the United Kingdom
South African rugby league players
Wales national rugby league team players